Noranside is a hamlet in Angus, Scotland, located at 56° 44' 0" North, 2° 52' 0" West,.

The prison HMP Noranside was operated there from 1966 to 2011.

References

Populated places in Angus, Scotland
Hamlets in Scotland